Okano may refer to:

Okano (surname), a Japanese surname
Okano Department, a department of Woleu-Ntem Province, Gabon
Okano River, a river of Gabon
Okano (album), a 2010 album by Zdravko Čolić
Oka-no, an alternate name for the former settlement Honsading, California, United States